La Fanfarria del Capitán is an Argentine band formed in 2004 by Victoria Cornejo, Jeronimo Cassagne, and Francisco Mercado. Originally named Capitan Tifus, the band created the Fanfarria Latina genre, which combines rock, cumbia, tango, ska, balcan, and Latin rhythms.

The band has played around the world, specially in Europe and also in Russia, China, and Japan. They tour every year since 2011 and have been on the road up to 7 months non stop.

In the last months, the band has grown in popularity due to their version of Bella Ciao popularized by the Netflix series La Casa de Papel.

La Fanfarria del Capitán has four albums edited, two released in Argentina and two in Austria and they will release their fifth in 2019.

History
The band's first album, Flores del Bosque de Bolonia (2007), was produced by Matías Cella (producer of Kevin Johansen and Jorge Drexler), and edited by EMI Publishing. Their second album was E Viva! (2012). Cella's production was edited in Austria by Newton Records.
 
In 2007, Capitan participated in the Nokia Trends Artemotion, a televised tour through Argentina. In the same year, Cornejo toured with Mad Professor through the UK and to play together in Madrid and Buenos Aires. 
 
In 2009, Capitan won the "Diente de Oro" award as a creative band, given by EMI to the most promising projects of the year.

In 2011, they were invited to the Botanique Festival (Bologna, Italia) to represent the music of Buenos Aires. This gave birth to their first international tour, with 40 concerts in Italy, Germany, the Czech Republic, Austria and Spain.

The "Mondo Tour 2012" consisted of 87 concerts over seven months through Argentina, Germany, the Netherlands, Sweden, the Czech Republic, Austria, Ukraine, Russia, China and Japan. Important festivals on this tour included the Fusion Festival (Larz, DE), Mighty Sounds (Tabor, CZ), Nuevo Sol (Rostock, DE), Movement Festival (Perm, RUS), Harvest Festival (Moscú, RUS), and OCT-Loft Jazz Festival (Shenzhen, China).

In 2013, their third international tour included Latin America and Europe. The tour started in Buenos Aires with the Pepsi Music Festival and was followed by European festivals such as Trutnov (CZ), Wild Mint (Russia) and Mundial (Belgium). Capitan Tifus played 60 concerts during the five months they were in Europe. They also shared gigs with Bomba Estereo (Lido, Berlin), Karamelo Santo (Die Pumpe, Kiel), and Bersuit Vergarabat (Karneval der Kulturen, Berlin).

In 2014, their fourth tour includes Germany, Czech Republic,  Austria, Belgium, Netherlands, Finland, Ukraine, Poland, Slovakia, Italy, France and Spain. The most important festivals of this tour were:  World Village Festival (Finland), Wutzrock Festival (Hamburg), Karneval der Kulturen (Berlin), Mundial Festival (Tilburg), Trutnov Festival (Trutnov), MIĘDZYNARODOWE ŚWIĘTO (Poland).

The 2016, tour includes the festivals Drienok Festival (Slovakia), Jatka Festival y Street Fetstival (Czech Rep), Transit Festival, Kulturfest Sindelfingen y Tropen Tango (Germany), Vijver Festival and Festival Onderstroom (Netherlands), Zomer Van Antwerpen (Belgium), Bimble Bandada Festival (UK), Dokufest (Kosovo), Finger Food Festival y Ariano Folk Festival (Italy).

In 2017, they tour 6 countries playing at Tollwood, Grimming&Grantig, Templiner Stadtfest y Pfederstall Festival (Germany), Drienok Festival (Slovakia), FestivalderAa (Netherlands) y Czeremcha open air (Poland).

During 2018, they tour together with Bersuit Vergarabat in Rusia due to the FIFA World Cup and play a concert together at the Central House of Artists of Moscow. The tour continues in 8 European countries and includes: Reeds Festival (Switzerland), Mana Festival, Open Air Klagenfurt (Austria), Tropen Tango, Jahr Markt Festival y Binger Open Air (Germany), Pohoda Festival (Slovakia), Babel Sounds (Hungary), Jatka Festival (Czech Republic).

Capitan was declared of Cultural Interest by the Secretary of Culture and the Ministry of Foreign Affairs of Argentina in 2011, 2012, and 2013.

Albums

After their debut album, Flores del Bosque de Bolonia, they produce a second album also directed by Matías Cella called E Viva!. Recorded at Los Elefantes studios from Argentinean musician Lito Vitale. The album is edited in Austria by Newton Records.

In 2013, they record a live album at Graz, Austria, which is edited in 2014 also by Newton Records.

La Giravida, is album number four. Produced by Diego Blanco (Los Pericos) and Jerónimo Cassagne, mastered by Eduardo Bergallo (Puro Mastering) it counts with the collaboration of artists: Chotokoeu (Spain), Mate Power (Germany), Kocani Orkestar (Macedonia), Raffaelle Quarta (Italia), Lisa Witt (Alemania), La Cesar Pavón Orquesta (Buenos Aires).

In 2018, started the recordings of Magias de Hoy, their fifth album and it feats Amsterdam Klezmer Band, Bersuit Vergarabat, and El Plan de la Mariposa is due to release in June 2019.

Discography

Videos

References

External links
 Capitan Official Website

2004 establishments in Argentina
Argentine rock music groups
Musical groups established in 2004
Musical groups from Buenos Aires